"Proper Education" is a remix of  the 1979 song "Another Brick in the Wall, Part II" by Pink Floyd by the Swedish DJ and electronic music producer Eric Prydz. It was released in Sweden on 24 November 2006 and in the United Kingdom on 1 January 2007. "Proper Education" reached number two on the UK Singles Chart and topped the US Billboard Hot Dance Airplay chart in 2007. On 8 December 2007, the song received a nomination for Best Remixed Recording at the 2008 Grammy Awards.

Music video
The music video for the song features Daniel Ilabaca escaping school (which connects to the original song's theme) while doing parkour stunts. They sneak into a number of apartments and perform energy efficient tasks, such as replacing lightbulbs with their energy efficient equivalent, turning down thermostats, turning off televisions, putting bricks in toilets (to save water), etc. Finally, they tap into the apartment complex's power grid and power down the whole building, before re-lighting some of the apartments so that the words "SWITCH OFF" appear in lights on the side of the building. The video ends with the words "you don't need an education to save the planet". The video was shot on the Broadwater Farm Estate in Tottenham.

Track listings

Swedish 12-inch single
A. "Proper Education"
B. "The Dub"

Dutch CD single
 "Proper Education" (radio edit)
 "Proper Education" (club mix)
 "Proper Education" (Sebastian Ingrosso)
 "Proper Education" (Sébastien Léger remix)

Spanish 12-inch single
A1. "Proper Education" (original) – 6:09
B1. "Proper Education" (dub) – 8:38
B2. "Proper Education" (Sebastian Ingrosso remix) – 8:59

UK CD1
 "Proper Education" (radio edit)
 "Proper Education" (club mix)

UK CD2
 "Proper Education" (radio edit)
 "Proper Education" (club mix)
 "Call on Me" (Henrik B remix)
 "Proper Education" (Sebastian Ingrosso remix)
 Extended interactive CD-ROM

UK 12-inch single
A. "Proper Education" (club mix)   
B. "Proper Education" (Sebastian Ingrosso remix)

US and Australian CD single
 "Proper Education" (radio edit)
 "Proper Education" (club mix)
 "Proper Education" (Sebastian Ingrosso remix)

Charts

Weekly charts

Year-end charts

Certifications

Release history

References

2006 singles
2006 songs
Data Records singles
Eric Prydz songs
Ministry of Sound singles
Number-one singles in Finland
Positiva Records singles
Songs written by David Gilmour
Songs written by Eric Prydz
Songs written by Roger Waters
Spinnin' Records singles
Ultra Records singles